Aysenoides is a genus of spiders in the family Anyphaenidae. It was first described in 2003 by Ramírez.  it contains 5 species from Chile and Argentina.

References

Anyphaenidae
Araneomorphae genera
Spiders of South America